WCOH may refer to:

 WCOH (FM), a radio station (107.3 FM) licensed to serve Du Bois, Pennsylvania, United States
 WRZX (AM), a radio station (1400 AM) licensed to serve Newnan, Georgia, United States, known as WCOH from 1947 to 2021